A number of prominent rabbis have been known by acronyms.

See also

 Lists of nicknames – nickname list articles on Wikipedia
 Hebrew acronyms

Lists of acronyms
Lists of nicknames
Acronyms
Rabbis